In Case You Didn't Feel Like Showing Up is a live album by American industrial metal band Ministry, released on September 4, 1990, by Sire Records.

Critical reception and legacy

Audio from the live performance of "Breathe", subtitled "Live from Gulag", has been featured in Warner Bros. Records' 1990 compilation album Just Say Da, volume four of the Just Say Yes series.

In 2005, In Case You Didn't Feel Like Showing Up was ranked number 328 in Rock Hard magazine's book of The 500 Greatest Rock & Metal Albums of All Time.

Track listing

Live Necronomicon
This 2017 re-release features more songs including covers from side-projects & bands like Lard, a Jourgensen and Barker side project featuring Jello Biafra, and Skinny Puppy with their frontman Nivek Ogre on vocals. In addition, the songs that had already appeared on In Case You Didn't Feel Like Showing Up (eg. The Missing) are presented raw and without any of the overdubbing present on the initial release.

Disc 1

Disc 2

Video
A companion home video also exists, featuring the same tracks as the audio except it is bookended by two "bonus" songs, "Breathe" and "The Land of Rape and Honey", and incorporates footage from two concerts, including the Merrillville, Indiana concert and a December 1989 New Year's Eve concert in Chicago. According to Patty Marsh (Al Jourgensen's wife in this time), the band were annoyed at having to wear exactly the same clothing on both concert dates and the video was difficult to edit properly due to small differences in each.

The beginning of the concert starts with a very textured dual drum jam then segues into "Breathe". After playing "Stigmata", Jello Biafra comes on stage and reads his own rendition of The Pledge of Allegiance.  After that, the band returns for an encore of "The Land of Rape and Honey."  Biafra remains on stage giving an almost dadaist performance art routine, largely alternating between sucking his thumb and giving a Nazi salute.

Personnel

Ministry
 Alain Jourgensen – vocals, guitar, production, art direction
 Paul Barker – bass, keyboards, production
 Bill Rieflin – electric drums
 Chris Connelly – keyboards, vocals (lead vocals on "So What")
 Mike Scaccia – guitar
 Martin Atkins – drums
 Terry Roberts – guitar
 Nivek Ogre – keyboards, guitar, vocals
 William Tucker – guitar
 Joe Kelly – background vocals
 Jello Biafra – flag pledge (Video only)

Additional personnel
 Jeff "Critter" Newell – engineer
 "Friskie" – assistant engineer
 "Linus" – assistant engineer
 "Ex-Con" – assistant engineer
 Kim Assaley – artwork
 Tom Recchion – design
 Dirk Walter – design

References

1990 live albums
Merrillville, Indiana
Ministry (band) albums
Sire Records live albums
Albums produced by Al Jourgensen